April O'Neil is a Teenage Mutant Ninja Turtles character.

April O'Neil may also refer to:

April O'Neil (actress), an American pornographic actress